Palmeiras–Barra Funda or just Barra Funda is a station on Line 3-Red of the São Paulo Metro and CPTM Line 7-Ruby and ViaMobilidade Line 8-Diamond of the commuter train. The metro station is inside the Palmeiras–Barra Funda Intermodal Terminal, a major transit station in São Paulo. The complex contains municipal, intercity, and metropolitan bus lines; metro; and commuter rail terminals. Since 2006, the station was known as Palmeiras–Barra Funda, named after football club Sociedade Esportiva Palmeiras.

Station layout

References

São Paulo Metro stations
Companhia Paulista de Trens Metropolitanos stations
Railway stations opened in 1988
1988 establishments in Brazil